The Max Planck Institute (MPI) for Biology of Ageing, founded in 2008, is one of over 80 independent, non-profit-making institutes set up under the umbrella of the Max Planck Society. The overall research aim is to obtain fundamental insights into the aging process and thus to pave the way towards healthier aging in humans. An international research team drawn from almost 30 nations is working to uncover underlying molecular, physiological and evolutionary mechanisms.

Located on the campus of Cologne University Hospital, this MPI forms a substantial part of a regional Life Science Cluster of closely interlinked research organizations focusing on research into ageing and ageing-associated diseases. Regional partners include the MPI for Metabolism Research and the Cluster of Excellence CECAD (both in Cologne) as well as the DZNE and caesar Research Center (both in Bonn).

Together with their regional, national and international partners, such as ERIBA, researchers at the MPI for Biology of Ageing are exploring how cells age throughout the course of their life, which genes are involved and to what extent environmental factors play a role. Underlying processes are being studied in so-called model organisms: The genes of the mouse Mus musculus, the fruit fly Drosophila melanogaster and the roundworm Caenorhabditis elegans are known and the life expectancy of these organisms is relatively short. This makes them particularly suitable for research into the ageing process. Further model organisms in the form of the African turquoise killifish Nothobranchius furzeri and the yeast Saccharomyces cerevisiae are in use.

Since the beginning of the research work in 2008 Adam Antebi (USA), Nils-Göran Larsson (Sweden) and Linda Partridge (UK) are jointly directing the institute. In 2018 Thomas Langer (Germany) was appointed as the fourth director of the institute. The Larsson Department has since resigned from the institute. Anne Schaefer (Germany) was appointed as a Director in 2021. 

The foundation stone for the new research premises was laid in 2010 and the building was inaugurated in 2013.

As one of the youngest institutes of the Max Planck Society, the MPI for Biology of Ageing is expanding further and should eventually have a staff of about 350. At least ten research groups are planned as well as a fourth department under the leadership of a further director.

Departments 
 Molecular Genetics of Ageing (Adam Antebi)
Mitochondrial Proteostasis (Thomas Langer)
 Biological Mechanisms of Ageing (Linda Partridge)

Research Groups 
Genetics and Biomarkers of Human Ageing (Joris Deelen / Research Group)
Cell Growth Control in Health and Age-related Disease (Constantinos Demetriades / Max Planck Research Group)
Metabolic and Genetic Regulation of Ageing (Martin Denzel / Research Group)
Autophagy Regulation (Martin Graef / Max Planck Research Group)
Mechanisms of DNA Repair (Ron Jachimowicz / Max Planck Research Group)
ADP-ribosylation in DNA repair and ageing (Ivan Matic / Research Group CECAD)
Genome Instability and Ageing (Stephanie Panier / Max Planck Research Group)
Metabolism of Infection (Lena Pernas/ Max Planck Research Group)
 Chromatin and Ageing (Peter Tessarz/ Max Planck Research Group)

Former Research Groups
 Skin Homeostasis and Ageing (Sara Wickström / Max Planck Research Group), moved to Helsinki University, and is now appointed a director at the Max Planck Institute for Molecular Biomedicine.
 Genome Evolution and Ageing (Jim Stewart/ Research Group), moved to the Biosciences Institute, Newcastle University. 
 Evolutionary and Experimental Biology of Ageing (Dario Riccardo Valenzano/ Max Planck Research Group), moved to the Leibniz Institute on Aging.

The "Max Planck Research Groups" offer young postdoctoral researchers the opportunity to qualify for a further career in research. Their leaders are appointed by the President of the Max Planck Society and enjoy independent status within an MPI, similar to that of the directors.

Cologne Graduate School of Ageing Research 
The Cologne Graduate School of Ageing Research was established in 2013 as a joint venture of the Graduate School of the Cellular Stress Responses in Aging-Associated Diseases (CECAD Graduate School) and the International Max Planck Research School for Ageing (IMPRS AGE). Associated institutes are the Cluster of Excellence - Cellular Stress Responses in Aging-Associated Diseases (CECAD), the Max Planck Institute for Biology of Ageing, the Max Planck Institute for Metabolism Research, the University of Cologne and the University Hospital of Cologne. The Graduate School offers exceptionally talented junior research scientists from all over the world the opportunity to obtain their doctorate in the field of ageing research within a three-year structured programme. Application requires a M.Sc. degree (or equivalent) and is possible from August 15 until November 7, 2022 for the upcoming application period. The structured graduate programme annually starts between July and October. The doctoral degrees are awarded by the University of Cologne.
Since 2019 the Cologne Graduate School of Ageing Research offers a Master Fellowship programme for excellent and motivated students that wish to learn more about ageing research, while pursuing the Master studies in the Biological Science or Biochemistry Master programme of the University of Cologne.

References

External links 
 Max Planck Institute for Biology of Ageing
Cologne Graduate School of Ageing Research 

Biogerontology organizations
Biology of Ageing
Educational institutions established in 2008
Education in Cologne
Lindenthal, Cologne
2008 establishments in Germany